Xu Zonghan ( 1877 - 8 March 1944) is a hero of the Xinhai Revolution, which overthrew China's Qing Dynasty in 1911. She was a medical doctor and companion of the revolutionary general, Huang Xing.

References

External links

People of the 1911 Revolution
1877 births
1944 deaths